Md. Rustum Ali Faraji (born 21 March 1952) is a Bangladeshi politician who is the incumbent Jatiya Sangsad member from the Pirojpur-3 constituency. He has been a member of Bangladesh Nationalist Party and Jatiya Party (Ershad).

Early life and career
Faraji worked as physician before becoming a politician.

Faraji was elected to the parliament from Pirojpur-3 as a Jatiya Party candidate in 1996 and as a Bangladesh Nationalist Party candidate in 2001. He was elected to Parliament on 5 January 2014 from Pirojpur-3 as an independent candidate. He is a member of the Parliamentary Standing Committee on Public Accounts.

References

Living people
1952 births
People from Pirojpur District
7th Jatiya Sangsad members
8th Jatiya Sangsad members
10th Jatiya Sangsad members
11th Jatiya Sangsad members
Independent politicians in Bangladesh
Jatiya Party politicians
Bangladesh Nationalist Party politicians